Baliochila amanica, the amani buff, is a butterfly in the family Lycaenidae. It is found in south-eastern Kenya and north-eastern Tanzania. Its habitat consists of lowland forests at altitudes ranging from sea level to 1,100 metres.

References

Butterflies described in 1953
Poritiinae